Monohansett Island is one of the Elizabeth Islands between Cedar Island and Naushon Island. The name is of Indian origin that goes back to the close of the seventeenth century.

References

Gosnold, Massachusetts
Coastal islands of Massachusetts
Elizabeth Islands
Islands of Dukes County, Massachusetts